Ksenia Olegovna Polikarpova (born 11 March 1990) is Russian-Israeli Olympic badminton player. 

In 2009, she won a bronze medal at the European Junior Championships in Milan, Italy. She also won bronze medals at the European Mixed Team Badminton Championships in 2011, 2013, and 2015 with Russian national badminton team. 

Polikarpova became an Israeli citizen in May 2017, and won a gold medal in 2017 Maccabiah Games. She competed at the Tokyo 2020 Summer Olympics, competing in women's singles, coming in 15th. At the 2022 Maccabiah Games, she won a gold medal in women's doubles and a silver medal in women's singles.

Achievements

European Junior Championships 
Girls' doubles

BWF Grand Prix (3 runners-up) 
The BWF Grand Prix had two levels, the Grand Prix and Grand Prix Gold. It was a series of badminton tournaments sanctioned by the Badminton World Federation (BWF) and played between 2007 and 2017.

Women's singles

Women's doubles

  BWF Grand Prix Gold tournament
  BWF Grand Prix tournament

BWF International Challenge/Series (13 titles, 8 runners-up) 
Women's singles

Women's doubles

Mixed doubles

  BWF International Challenge tournament
  BWF International Series tournament
  BWF Future Series tournament

References

External links
 
 
  at the 2015 European Games (archived)

1990 births
Living people
Sportspeople from Saint Petersburg
Russian female badminton players
Israeli female badminton players
P
P
Badminton players at the 2015 European Games
European Games competitors for Russia
Badminton players at the 2019 European Games
European Games competitors for Israel
Competitors at the 2017 Maccabiah Games
Competitors at the 2022 Maccabiah Games
Maccabiah Games gold medalists for Israel
Maccabiah Games silver medalists for Israel
Maccabiah Games medalists in badminton
Badminton players at the 2020 Summer Olympics
Olympic badminton players of Israel